Gustav Grachegg (17 November 1882 – 13 May 1945) was an Austrian equestrian. He competed in the individual dressage event at the 1928 Summer Olympics. He was reported to be missing in action during World War II.

References

External links
 

1882 births
1945 deaths
Austrian male equestrians
Olympic equestrians of Austria
Equestrians at the 1928 Summer Olympics
People from Leibnitz District
Sportspeople from Styria
Missing in action of World War II